Saturday Night SuperFight was a professional wrestling pay-per-view (PPV) event produced by the Major League Wrestling (MLW) promotion, which took place at the Cicero Stadium in Cicero, Illinois on November 2, 2019. This was MLW's first pay-per-view event and the second event under the Superfight chronology. The event aired live on traditional PPV outlets and FITE TV.

Twelve matches were contested at the event including four on the pre-show. The main event was a no disqualification match, in which Jacob Fatu defeated LA Park to retain the World Heavyweight Championship. In other prominent matches on the card, Alexander Hammerstone defeated Davey Boy Smith, Jr. to retain the National Openweight Championship, Teddy Hart defeated Austin Aries to retain the World Middleweight Championship, The Von Erichs (Ross and Marshall) defeated The Dynasty (Maxwell J. Friedman and Richard Holliday) in a Texas Tornado match to win the World Tag Team Championship and Mance Warner defeated Jimmy Havoc and Bestia 666 in a Stairway to Hell match.

Production

Background
In July 2017, Major League Wrestling resumed promoting events for the first time since the promotion's original closure in 2004. The success of these events lead MLW to secure a television deal with beIN Sports for a new program, MLW Fusion, which debuted on April 20, 2018. In November, MLW broke their attendance record with their Fightland event in Chicago at Cicero Stadium. Eventually, MLW began airing live specials on beIN Sports, in which the promotion was broadcast live during Fusion television tapings. MLW's first live special of 2019 was SuperFight, which was held in Philadelphia, Pennsylvania at the 2300 Arena.

On July 5, 2019, MLW announced their first pay-per-view event titled Saturday Night SuperFight, which would be held on November 2, 2019 at the Cicero Stadium in Cicero, Illinois. On August 8, MLW announced that they had reached a deal with FITE TV to produce content for their streaming network, with Saturday Night SuperFight being the first MLW event produced for the platform. Before the event aired on pay-per-view, a live pre-show aired as a special episode of MLW Fusion.

Storylines 
The event features professional wrestling matches that will involved different wrestlers from pre-existing scripted feuds and storylines. Wrestlers will portray villains, heroes, or less distinguishable characters in scripted events that built tension and will culminated in a wrestling match or series of matches.

On April 5, 2019, LA Park won the Battle Riot, earning a "Golden Ticket" for a MLW World Heavyweight Championship match at any time of his choosing. On September 7, it was announced that LA Park would cash in his "Golden Ticket" and face MLW Champion Jacob Fatu at Saturday Night SuperFight.

Event

Pre-show 
In the opening match, Savio Vega took on Leo Brien. Vega avoided a middle rope elbow drop from Brien and attacked him and shoved the referee down, allowing Brien to hit Vega with a cowbell and a diving elbow drop for the win. However, Vega attacked Brien with a kendo stick after the match.

Next, Air Wolf took on the debuting Gino Medina. After avoiding a Pele kick by Wolf, Medina hit a knee strike and an Eat Da-Feet for the win.

Next, El Hijo de L.A. Park took on Zenshi. After avoiding a 450° splash by Zenshi, Park nailed a package piledriver to Zenshi for the win.

The final match on the pre-show was a three-way tag team match pitting Contra Unit (Simon Gotch and Ikuro Kwon) against Dominic Garrini and Douglas James and The Spirit Squad (Mike Mondo and Kenn Doane). Garrini applied an armbar on Doane but Doane caught the ropes, allowing Kwon to spit mist into Mondo's face and Gotch nailed a cradle piledriver to Mondo for the win.

Preliminary matches

The event kicked off with a Texas Tornado match, in which The Dynasty (Maxwell J. Friedman and Richard Holliday) defended the World Tag Team Championship against The Von Erichs (Marshall Von Erich and Ross Von Erich). After dumping Holliday out of the ring, the Von Erichs hit a claw slam to MJF to win the titles.

Next, Gringo Loco, Puma King, and Septimo Dragon took on Injustice (Jordan Oliver, Kotto Brazil, and Myron Reed) in a six-man tag team match. Reed delivered a springboard 450° splash to Dragon for the win.

Next, Teddy Hart defended the World Middleweight Championship against Austin Aries. After kicking out of a roll-up by Aries, Hart executed a Hart Destroyer to Aries to retain the title.

Next, Low Ki took on Brian Pillman Jr. Pillman threw his mouthguard at Ki and Ki nailed a running somersault kick to Pillman for the win.

Next, Tom Lawlor took on Timothy Thatcher. Lawlor made Thatcher submit to the rear naked choke for the win.

Later, Bestia 666 took on Jimmy Havoc and Mance Warner in a Stairway to Hell match. Warner drove Bestia through a table with a superplex to win the match. Havoc attacked Warner from behind after the match and nailed a piledriver to Warner on the steel guard rail and delivered an Acid Rainmaker to Warner.

This was followed by the penultimate match, in which Alexander Hammerstone defended the National Openweight Championship against Davey Boy Smith Jr. Smith countered a Nightmare Pendulum by Hammerstone into a cradle and a series of cradles between the two culminated with Hammerstone pinning Smith with a schoolboy while grabbing the ropes for leverage to retain the title.

Main event match
The main event was a No Disqualification match, in which Jacob Fatu defended the World Heavyweight Championship against L.A. Park. Park avoided a moonsault by Fatu and covered him for the pinfall but Fatu's Contra Unit teammate Josef Samael interfered by throwing a fireball into the referee's eyes and Park tried to hit a spear to Samael but Samael ducked and Salina de la Renta was hit with it being sent through a table. The distraction allowed Fatu to hit a superkick, a pop-up Samoan drop and a moonsault to Park to retain the title.

Results

Gallery

See also
2019 in professional wrestling

References

External links
Saturday Night Superfight official website

Major League Wrestling
Professional wrestling in the Chicago metropolitan area
Events in Cicero, Illinois
2019 in Illinois
November 2019 events in the United States
2019 in professional wrestling
Pay-per-view professional wrestling events